Namguro Station is a station on the Seoul Subway Line 7. The station was named because this station is located in the southern part of the Guro neighborhood. Namguro Station opened on February 29, 2000. In the vicinity of Namguro Station, there are Guro General Social Welfare Center, Garibong-dong Residents Center and Guro 2/4 Residents Center.

Station layout

Vicinity
Exit 1: Samsung Raemian APT
Exit 2: Guronam Elementary School
Exit 3: Garibong-dong
Exit 4: Youngil Elementary School
Exit 5: Guro Market
Exit 6: Doosan APT

References

Metro stations in Guro District, Seoul
Seoul Metropolitan Subway stations
Railway stations opened in 2000